Ayinde X. Ubaka (born February 9, 1985) is an American former professional basketball player. He played college basketball for the California Golden Bears and spent seven seasons playing professionally overseas.

High school career
Ubaka attended Oakland High School in Oakland, California. As a junior, he averaged 23 points, 8 rebounds and 8 assists per game. As a senior, he averaged 23.5 points, 6.5 rebounds and 5.0 assists per game as he earned fourth-team Parade All-American honors, selected first team all-state by Cal-Hi Sports, first-team All-ANG Newspapers and league MVP, and chosen All-Metro by the San Francisco Chronicle.

Ubaka also played both quarterback and cornerback on the Oakland High football team his sophomore and senior years.

College career
In his freshman season at California, Ubaka ranked third in the Pac-10 in assist-to-turnover ratio (1.96) and ninth in the league in assists to earn honorable mention Pac-10 All-Freshman honors. He also earned Cal's 2004 Most Unselfish Player Award. In 28 games (26 starts), he averaged 6.4 points, 2.1 rebounds and 3.9 assists per game.

In his sophomore season, Ubaka missed a portion of the year due to injury. On November 23, 2004, he broke the fifth metatarsal in his left foot which required surgery and two months on the sidelines. He returned to action on January 15, 2005. In 18 games (11 starts), he averaged 6.1 points, 2.0 rebounds and 2.7 assists per game.

In his junior season, Ubaka improved dramatically. He was named to the second team NABC all-district, as well as the all-tournament team at the Pac-10 Tournament. He was also the co-recipient of Cal's Most Improved Player Award. In 31 games (all starts), he averaged 14.5 points, 3.0 rebounds and 3.8 assists per game.

In his senior season, Ubaka had another solid year as he was named to the All-Pac-10 Honorable Mention team. In 33 games, he averaged 13.7 points, 3.0 rebounds and 4.7 assists per game.

Professional career

Europe
After going undrafted in the 2007 NBA draft, Ubaka joined the Charlotte Bobcats for the 2007 NBA Summer League. He later signed with Śląsk Wrocław of Poland but left after pre-season. In November 2007, he signed with Czarni Słupsk but managed just two games for the club before moving to Germany and joining Skyliners Frankfurt on a two-month contract. In January 2008, he left Skyliners after appearing in 11 games and signed with the Antwerp Giants for the rest of the season.

In July 2008, Ubaka joined the Golden State Warriors for the 2008 NBA Summer League. On November 6, 2008, he was allocated to the Anaheim Arsenal of the NBA Development League. On January 2, 2009, he was waived by the Arsenal. Ubaka played 12 games for the Arsenal where he averaged 3.2 points and 1.1 rebounds in a reserve role. On February 20, 2009, he signed with Phantoms Braunschweig of Germany for the rest of the season.

Australia
In August 2009, Ubaka signed with the Gold Coast Blaze for the 2009–10 NBL season. In 22 games for the Blaze, he averaged 16.3 points, 2.6 rebounds and 4.2 assists per game.

On June 1, 2010, Ubaka signed with the Cairns Taipans for the 2010–11 NBL season. He was selected to the All-NBL Third Team and he helped the Taipans to their first ever grand final appearance. In 34 games for the Taipans, he averaged 13.9 points, 2.7 rebounds and 4.0 assists per game.

In May 2011, Ubaka signed with the Melbourne Tigers for the 2011–12 NBL season. On January 16, 2012, he was released by the Tigers following a 73–60 loss to the Gold Coast Blaze the previous day. A week later, he signed with the Wollongong Hawks for the rest of the season. His first game for the Hawks was against the Tigers, where he scored 15 points in a win.

Ukraine
On November 9, 2012, Ubaka signed with BC Goverla of the Ukraine for the rest of the season. In January 2013, he left Goverla after appearing in 13 games where he averaged 8.1 points, 2.0 rebounds and 1.7 assists per game.

Return to Melbourne
On October 8, 2013, Ubaka returned to the Melbourne Tigers, signing with the club for the 2013–14 NBL season. However, just seven games into the season, he was released by the Tigers on November 17, 2013. He averaged 5.3 points per game in his seven-game stint with the Tigers.

Post-playing career
In January 2014, Ubaka joined Project Basketball as a skills trainer and as their Director of Player Development.

References

External links
California bio
DraftExpress.com profile
Superleague profile
NBL stats

1985 births
Living people
American expatriate basketball people in Australia
American expatriate basketball people in Belgium
American expatriate basketball people in Germany
American expatriate basketball people in Poland
American men's basketball players
Anaheim Arsenal players
Basketball Löwen Braunschweig players
Basketball players from San Francisco
Cairns Taipans players
California Golden Bears men's basketball players
Gold Coast Blaze players
Melbourne Tigers players
Parade High School All-Americans (boys' basketball)
Point guards
Shooting guards
Skyliners Frankfurt players
Basketball players from Oakland, California